The Columbus Lions are a professional indoor football team based in Columbus, Georgia and are a member of the American Indoor Football Alliance. The were a founding member of the National Arena League (NAL) for the 2017 season.  The Lions were founded in 2006 as an expansion team of the World Indoor Football League (WIFL). After the WIFL went under in 2007, the Lions joined the American Indoor Football Association (AIFA) where they played for two seasons. When the AIFA broke apart, the Lions joined the Southern Indoor Football League (SIFL). The Lions joined the Professional Indoor Football League (PIFL) in 2012 when the Southern Indoor Football League (SIFL) teams split up into two new leagues. After the 2015 season, the PIFL broke apart, and the Lions joined American Indoor Football for 2016.

In their first 12 seasons, the Lions have compiled a regular season record of 100–47 with division championships in 2009, 2011 and 2016. They have made six championship appearances: in the 2010 season where they defeated the Louisiana Swashbucklers in President's Cup II, in 2015 when they defeated the Richmond Raiders in PIFL Cup IV, in 2016 where they defeated the West Michigan Ironmen in the AIF Championship game, in 2017 when the Lions lost to the Jacksonville Sharks 21–27 in the inaugural NAL Championship, in 2018 with 66–8 loss to the Carolina Cobras and a 79-62 loss to the Albany Empire in 2021.

History

Beginnings & Championships
The Lions were founded in 2006. They began play in the short-lived World Indoor Football League in 2007.  The Lions' inaugural game on February 26, 2007, was marred by tragedy when opposing defensive back Javon Camon of the Daytona Beach Thunder was killed after a hard but clean hit by Lions fullback Cedric Ware during the fourth quarter.

For the Lions' impressive inaugural season, head coach Jason Gibson won the league's inaugural Coach of the Year Award.

The WIFL collapsed after the season and the Lions moved to the American Indoor Football Association where they played two seasons in 2008 and 2009.  They would then join the Southern Indoor Football League and play from 2010 to 2011 before the SIFL split into two separate league with the Lions going to the Professional Indoor Football League in 2012.

Following the Lions' 2015 PIFL Cup IV Championship, the Lions moved back to American Indoor Football.

The Lions move to the AIF proved to be fruitful for the Lions, and they completed the regular season 8-0 and won the 2016 AIF Championship with a perfect record. One week after winning the championship, the Lions announced they were leaving the AIF for the 2017 season.

National Arena League
In July 2016, Lions' owners Skip Seda and his father, Keke Seda, announced the formation of a new league called the Arena Developmental League to begin play in spring 2017. They named former Canadian Football League, Arena Football League, and AF2 coach John Gregory as the league's commissioner. In November 2016, the Jacksonville Sharks joined and the Sedas yielded control over the new league for it to become the National Arena League.

The Lions would appear in the NAL playoffs in every season since the league's inception.  They, and the NAL, would not play in 2020 due to the COVID-19 pandemic.  They would make three appearances in the NAL Championship Game losing to the Jacksonville Sharks 27-21 in 2017, the Carolina Cobras 66-8 in 2018 and the Albany Empire 79–62 in 2021.

New Era
On August 30, 2022, the Lions announced new ownership led by Jeff Levack, who also has ownership stake in the Orlando Predators and Albany Empire.  He was a part of two staffs that helped the Empire win three championships in four years.   On September 13, 2022, they introduced new branding for the team designed by former player and designer, Mike Jones. The new branding pays homage to the original branding that was around for the past 16 years. They also announced arena football veteran player and coach Chris McKinney as only the second head coach in team history.  On December 22, the National Arena League had announced that the membership of the Lions had been discontinued. One day later the Lions announced they have joined the regional American Indoor Football Alliance.

Players

Current roster

Awards and honors
The following is a list of all Lions players who have won league awards:

Season-by-season results

References

External links

 Official site
 Lions' 2008 stats
 Lions' 2009 stats
 Lions' 2011 stats

 
2006 establishments in Georgia (U.S. state)
National Arena League teams